Laelaptiella is a genus of mites in the family Ologamasidae. There are about five described species in Laelaptiella.

Species
These five species belong to the genus Laelaptiella:
 Laelaptiella anomala Womersley, 1956
 Laelaptiella cultrata Karg, 1993
 Laelaptiella eupodalia Karg, 1996
 Laelaptiella mackerrasae (Domrow, 1957)
 Laelaptiella media Karg, 1976

References

Ologamasidae